Helen Huang (born October 1982) is a classical pianist.   She began studying piano in 1987, performing and touring with major symphony orchestras.

Musical career
Huang was born in Ibaraki, Japan, of Taiwanese parents. Her family moved to the United States in 1985 and Huang began her piano study in 1987.  She attended the Manhattan School of Music, and then the Juilliard School, where she studied with the Israeli pianist Yoheved Kaplinsky, graduating in 2004.

Huang made her debut with a major symphony orchestra at age 8, when she performed with the Philadelphia Orchestra.  She went on to perform in December 1992 with the New York Philharmonic under the direction of Kurt Masur, with whom she continued to maintain a close association.

Huang has performed with several major orchestras, including the Cleveland Orchestra, the U.S. National Symphony Orchestra, the New York Philharmonic, the Philadelphia Orchestra, the Saint Louis Symphony, the Leipzig Gewandhaus Orchestra and the London Philharmonic.  She has toured with the New York Philharmonic (in 1998 and again in 1999), the Pittsburgh Symphony (1998–99) and the Vienna Chamber Orchestra.

She has been a member of the Juilliard School faculty since 2008.

Awards
Huang is the recipient of numerous awards including the Manhattan School of Music concerto competition (1992); the Martin E. Segal Award (1994); and the Avery Fisher Career Grant (1995).

Discography
Introducing Helen Huang (1995)
Beethoven, Piano Concerto No. 1 in C major, Op. 15
Mozart, Piano Concerto No. 23 in A major, K. 488
Helen Huang: For Children (1996)
Villa-Lobos, A Prole do bebê (8), suite for piano, Book 1 ("A família do bebê"), A. 140
Debussy, Children's Corner, suite for piano (or orchestra), L. 113
Mozart, Variations on "Ah vous dirai-je, Maman", for piano in C major, K. 265 (K. 300e)
Mendelssohn, Songs without Words for piano No. 34 in C major ("Spinnerlied"), Op. 67/4
Schumann, Kinderszenen (Scenes from Childhood) for piano, Op. 15
Liszt, Gnomenreigen, for piano (Zwei Konzertetüden No. 2), S. 145/2 (LW A218/2)
Helen Huang (1998)
Mozart, Piano Concerto No. 21 in C major ("Elvira Madigan") K. 467
Mendelssohn, Piano Concerto No. 1 in G minor, Op. 25
Mendelssohn,   for piano and orchestra in B minor, Op. 22
Georg Tintner: Violin Sonata; Works for Piano (with Cho-Liang Lin, violin) (2007)
Tintner, Sonata for violin & piano
Tintner, Variations on a Theme of Chopin, for piano
Tintner, Sehnsucht (Longing), prelude for piano
Tintner, Auf den Tod eines Freundes (On the death of a Friend), for piano
Tintner, Piano Sonata in F minor
Tintner, Fugue for piano in G major (Allegro)
Tintner, Fugue for piano in C minor (Bewegt)
Tintner, Trauermusik (Musica Tragica), for piano

References

External links

1982 births
Living people
American classical pianists
American women classical pianists
American musicians of Taiwanese descent
American women musicians of Chinese descent
People from Ibaraki Prefecture
Japanese emigrants to the United States
Juilliard School alumni
Manhattan School of Music alumni
American classical musicians of Chinese descent
Juilliard School faculty
20th-century American pianists
20th-century classical pianists
20th-century American women pianists
21st-century American pianists
21st-century classical pianists
21st-century American women pianists
Women music educators